James Evans (March 25, 1848 – June 23, 1880) was an Ontario political figure. He represented Middlesex East in the Legislative Assembly of Ontario from 1867 to 1871 as a Liberal member.

Evans served as reeve of West Nissouri. He ran unsuccessfully for the East Middlesex seat in the legislative assembly for the Province of Canada in 1863. He was also an unsuccessful candidate for East Middlesex in the 1872 federal election.

External links 
The Canadian parliamentary companion, HJ Morgan (1871)

Ontario Liberal Party MPPs
1848 births
1880 deaths